Air Greenland domestic airport network includes all 13 civilian airports within Greenland. Two international airports capable of serving large airliners−Kangerlussuaq Airport and Narsarsuaq Airport−were formerly used as U.S. Air Force military bases, and have been used for transatlantic flights.

All other regional airports are STOL-capable, and are served with Bombardier Dash 8 Q200 fixed-wing aircraft. Outside Greenland, the airline operates transatlantic flights to Keflavík International Airport in Iceland, and to Copenhagen Airport in Denmark.

Smaller communities are served by settlement flights from the local helicopter hubs in Upernavik Airport in the Upernavik Archipelago in northwestern Greenland, in Uummannaq Heliport in the Uummannaq Fjord region in northwestern Greenland, Ilulissat Airport and Aasiaat Airport in the Disko Bay region in western Greenland, in Qaqortoq Heliport and Nanortalik Heliport in southern Greenland, and in Tasiilaq Heliport in southeastern Greenland. Out of 45 heliports served, 8 are primary, the remainder are helistops.

The following is a list of destinations served by Air Greenland as of December 2022.

Destinations

As of December 2022, Air Greenland operates scheduled passenger flights to the following airports:

References

Lists of airline destinations